Andogsky is a rural locality (a settlement) in Nelazskoye Rural Settlement, Cherepovetsky District, Vologda Oblast, Russia. The population was 297 as of 2010. There are 11 streets.

Geography 
Krivets is the nearest rural locality.

References 

Rural localities in Cherepovetsky District